Charles Lowe may refer to:

Charles Lowe (cricketer) (1890–1953), English cricketer
Charles Herbert Lowe (1920–2002), American herpetologist
Charlie Lowe, American baseball player
Chad Lowe (Charles Lowe, born 1968), American actor and director
 Charles Upton Lowe, physician, discoverer of oculocerebrorenal syndrome
Charles Lowe (judge), judge of the Supreme Court of Victoria

See also
Charles Lowell (disambiguation)